The Alte Kirche (Old Church) was the oldest church building in the Leuben district of the German city of Dresden, built in 1512 (though there has been a parish was first set up in Leuben in 1362). The main church was demolished in 1901 after the construction of the Himmelfahrtskirche, but the tower survives as a cultural monument.

Churches completed in 1512
16th-century churches in Germany
Former churches in Dresden